John Maneniaru (born 20 June 1965) is a politician of Solomon Islands who served as Minister for Fisheries and Marine Resources, and very briefly Minister for Finance and Treasury. He served as Deputy Prime Minister under Prime Minister Sogavare until 30 September 2019 when he was terminated after abstaining in the vote to switch Solomon Islands' recognition from Taiwan to China.

References

Finance Ministers of the Solomon Islands
Solomon Islands politicians
Government ministers of the Solomon Islands
1965 births
Living people
Deputy Prime Ministers of the Solomon Islands
Fisheries and Marine Resources ministers of the Solomon Islands